Nurul Islam Nahid (born 5 July 1945) is a Bangladeshi politician and author. He served a member of the Bangladeshi parliament from the Sylhet-6 constituency from 15 years, being elected in 1996, 2008, 2014, and 2018. He was also the country's Minister of Education from 2014 to 2018.

Early life and education 
Nurul Islam Nahid was born on 5 July 1945, to a Bengali Muslim family in the village of Kashba in Beanibazar, Sylhet District. His education began at the Kashba Primary School. He then enrolled at the Panchakhanda Hargovind High School, from which he received his Matriculation in 1961.

His political career began whilst he was studying at the Murari Chand College in Sylhet, and later at the University of Dhaka. He was elected as the President of the Bangladesh Student Union in 1970, and was a founding president of Jubo Union in 1976.

Career
During the time of the agitation against Ayub Khan, Nahid was active in the student movements against military rule in Pakistan and the mass upsurge of 1969. He was also an organiser of the guerrilla unit of the Students Union in the 1971 Bangladesh Liberation War. Nahid became general secretary of Communist Party of Bangladesh in 1991. He played a very significant role in the movement in 1990, resulting in the establishment of a democratically elected government in Bangladesh. He joined the Awami League in 1994, becoming a Member of Bangladesh National Parliament (1996–2001).

Nahid served as the vice-president of the 38th session of UNESCO General Conference for the term of 2015 to 2017. He was re-elected as the vice-president for the 39th session of the UNESCO General Conference at its headquarters at Paris in France.

Bibliography 
Nahid has also authored seven books and hundreds of articles:
Bangali Rukhe Darao (2006)
Bongobondhur Adorsho, Lokkho o Shongram (2007)
Rajnitir Shusthodhara Punoruddharer Shongram (2009)
Shikkhaniti o Onnanno Proshongo (2009)
Bangladesher Obbhudoy o Gonotontrer Poth Porikroma (2006)

Personal life 
Nahid is married to Zohra Jasmine, a civil officer. They have two daughters. The eldest daughter, Nadia Nandita Islam Tinni is an assistant professor of linguistics at Dhaka University who married to Gonojagoron Moncho spokesman Imran H Sarkar later they divorced. Their youngest daughter, Nazia Samantha Islam, works in the private sector.

References

External links
 

Living people
Awami League politicians
1945 births
Education ministers of Bangladesh
People from Beanibazar Upazila
11th Jatiya Sangsad members
Murari Chand College alumni
University of Dhaka alumni
21st-century Bengalis
20th-century Bengalis
Bangladeshi communists